Radovan Fuchs (born 5 September 1953) is a Croatian scientist and politician serving as Minister of Science and Education since 2020. 

His paternal grandfather, Hinko, was a grain merchant who emigrated to Croatia from Germany, while his paternal grandmother, Eugenia, was from Hungary. The couple settled in Croatian region of Slavonia. His maternal grandparents were from Vela Luka. Fuchs is of Croatian, Hungarian and Jewish descent. His father converted to Catholicism, and Christmas and other Catholic holidays were always celebrated in the Fuchs household. He is a relative, on his father side, of Croatian composer Vatroslav Lisinski. Fuchs graduated in 1979 from the Veterinary Faculty at the University of Zagreb. He received his master's degree in 1984 in the field of biomedicine. Fuchs obtained his PhD diploma in 1988 on the biomedical center at Uppsala University in Sweden. Dissertation which he defended was from the field of toxicology and pharmacology.

References 

1953 births
Living people
Scientists from Zagreb
Croatian people of German-Jewish descent
Croatian people of Hungarian-Jewish descent
Croatian Democratic Union politicians
Faculty of Veterinary Medicine, University of Zagreb alumni
Government ministers of Croatia
Democratic Centre (Croatia) politicians